The Professional Rugby Organization, known as PRO Rugby, was an American professional rugby union competition. PRO began play in April 2016 with five teams and ceased operations by January 2017. The competition was sanctioned by USA Rugby and by World Rugby. This was the first professional rugby competition in North America.

History

Previous attempts
For several years prior to PRO Rugby's launch in 2016, a number of entities had explored a professional competition for fifteen-a-side rugby. The Rugby Super League, a national competition that began play in 1997, was discussed as potentially becoming a professional competition,, but the RSL struggled financially, with several teams exiting the competition from 2009 to 2012 before the league folded after the 2012 season.

In 2012, the American Professional Rugby Competition was reported to be exploring a launch of a ten-team league for 2015, but nothing came of it.

The National Rugby Football League also announced its intention to begin a professional rugby competition and scheduled the Independence Cup, but the venture never got off the ground.

PRO Rugby launch
In early November 2015, PRO Rugby launched its Facebook page and scheduled an announcement for November 9, 2015. On November 9, 2015, PRO Rugby made an official announcement outlining its plans and a framework for the competition.  USA Rugby affirmed that it sanctioned and supported the PRO Rugby competition. PRO Rugby announced its first team, Sacramento, on November 18, 2015. PRO Rugby announced its second team, San Francisco, on November 19, 2015.

Though teams were scheduled to have coaches by the end of 2015, the uncertainty caused by the open position for head coach of the U.S. national rugby team led to PRO Rugby announcements being put on hold. As of mid-January 2016, with the U.S. head coach in place but no further developments from Pro Rugby, the league then offered the explanation that negotiating venues was what was holding up coach and player announcements but that three venues were close to agreement. On January 22, 2016, PRO Rugby announced San Diego as the league's third team, and media sources started speculating that the league may have only five teams in 2016 instead of the planned six teams. PRO Rugby announced on February 9, 2016 that the league's fourth team would be based in Columbus, Ohio. PRO Rugby officially announced on February 26, 2016 that Denver would be the competition's fifth team.

2016 inaugural season
The league had planned to hold a player draft in early 2016, and the league reportedly had begun extending contract offers to select players by mid-February. In early March, the league made its first official announcement regarding player signings when it announced that Italian international Mirco Bergamasco would be joining the Sacramento team. Teams started convening their players in mid-March 2016 to begin training.

The competition began play on April 17, 2016. The first weekend of PRO Rugby saw Denver win at home against Ohio 16–13 before 2,300 fans despite a snowstorm, and Sacramento defeated San Francisco 37–25 before a crowd of 3,400 in Sacramento. The inaugural PRO Rugby Championship was decided in the last game of the season on July 31, 2016, with the Denver Stampede clinching the title by gaining a bonus point despite losing away to the Ohio Aviators 32–25.

2016–17 off-season and folding
During the offseason, Director of Rugby Steve Lewis left PRO Rugby, with no replacement named. It was later reported that Lewis claimed PRO Rugby and Schoninger owed him unpaid salary and expenses; Lewis filed a claim in court, went to the New York state labor board, and also filed a grievance with USA Rugby.

The league had announced its intention to expand in 2017. Expansion was expected to include teams in the northeast United States. PRO Rugby stated that the 2017 competition format planned to include eight teams split into a west coast conference and a midwest/east conference. Expansion had been anticipated to include Canada in 2017, with PRO Rugby close to agreeing to place teams in Toronto and Vancouver. Rugby Canada announced on November 2, 2016, that an agreement with PRO for sanctioning in Canada for 2017 could not be reached, with the primary reason being their disagreement with an exclusivity clause that would have prevented Rugby Canada from sanctioning other professional rugby clubs in Canada in the future. In turn, PRO Rugby announced that it would no longer contract Canadian players.

The league folded the San Francisco Rush in December 2016. Schoninger blamed the folding on the lack of a suitable venue, and on lack of support from the local media. All PRO Rugby players then received notice on December 20, 2016, that their contracts would be terminated in 30 days if progress was not made towards resolving disputes between the league and USA Rugby. As of 2018, numerous players still report to have not been paid the salaries specified in their contracts with PRO Rugby. To recover some of their lost income, some players filed claims with their local labor commissioner offices. No other official announcements were made.

By the end of 2017, neither Schoninger or any representative for PRO Rugby had shown up in any of the court cases in regards to the expenses owed to former director Lewis and others from the operation on the lone Pro Rugby season.

Competition format
Each team played 12 regular-season games over 16 weeks: six home matches and six away. Teams were awarded 4 points for a win, and 2 points for a draw. Teams were also awarded 1 point if they lost by 7 points or fewer, as well as for scoring 4 or more tries in a match. There was no post-season with the Championship decided on league table points.

The season ran from April to July with the teams having a lighter schedule during the June international test window, a time when teams lost players to the U.S. national team.

Teams

The league began play in 2016 with five U.S. based teams.

The competition operated in a single-entity structure with all teams, at least initially, owned by the league, itself; individual investors own an interest in the competition but did not own individual teams.

Former teams

Players
Each team had a roster limit of 30 players, five of whom could have been foreign players. All player contracts were held by the league, not by the individual teams. Players earned salaries, on average, of around $25,000, with national team players making closer to $40,000. The top players in the competition earned up to $70,000.

The following foreign PRO Rugby players have earned caps for a Tier One nation:

PRO Rugby also signed several US-capped internationals who had been playing professionally overseas:

Broadcast
Matches were available to stream through prorugby.org or on cable through ONE World Sports. Initially, selected matches were available free to all online through AOL.com, but this came to an abrupt and unexplained end. Through the league's official website, all matches were streamed free to all viewers. ONE World Sports was offered by multiple cable and satellite providers and covered a range of sports, most notably a large selection of soccer, prior to its liquidation.

The league signed a deal with Time Warner Cable to provide streaming of games from Ohio on April 28, 2016.

Executives
 Douglas Schoninger – CEO

See also
 Major League Rugby
 Rugby union in the United States
 USA Rugby
 United States national rugby union team
 Professional sports leagues in the United States

References

External links
 

 
Defunct rugby union competitions in the United States
United States
Rugby union leagues in the United States
2016 establishments in the United States
Sports leagues established in 2016
2017 disestablishments in the United States
Sports leagues disestablished in 2017
Defunct professional sports leagues in the United States